Maloja Pass (Italian: Passo del Maloja, German: Malojapass) (1815m a.s.l.) is a high mountain pass in the Swiss Alps in the canton of Graubünden, linking the Engadine with the Val Bregaglia, still in Switzerland and Chiavenna in Italy. It marks the divide between the Danube and Po watersheds. Lägh da Bitabergh is near the pass.

The road from Chiavenna to Silvaplana with distances and elevation:
 0 km Chiavenna  333 m
 10 km Castasegna (Italian-Swiss border) 696 m
 13 km Promontogno  802 m
 16 km Stampa  994 m
 18 km Borgonovo 1029 m
 19 km Vicosoprano 1065 m
 27 km Casaccia 1458 m
 32 km Maloja Pass 1815 m
 33 km Maloja 1809 m
 40 km Sils im Engadin/Segl 1798 m
 44 km Silvaplana 1802 m

The Maloja Pass is open in winter. However, after heavy snowfalls the road may be closed for a couple of hours or for an entire day. Even if open, the road might be covered with snow making snow/winter tires, or chains, a necessity.

See also
 Engadine Line, a geological structure
 List of highest paved roads in Switzerland (roads above 1,850 m)
 List of highest road passes in Switzerland
 List of mountain passes in Switzerland
 Maloja Wind

References

External links 
 Cyclists descend the pass on the seventh stage of the 92nd Giro d'Italia

Engadin
Mountain passes of Graubünden
Mountain passes of Switzerland
Val Bregaglia